The Eurocopter EC155 (now Airbus Helicopters H155) is a long-range medium-lift passenger transport helicopter developed by Eurocopter from its Dauphin family for civil aviation use. It is a twin-engined aircraft and can carry up to 13 passengers along with 1 or 2 crew, depending on customer configuration. The helicopter is marketed for passenger transport, offshore support, VIP corporate transport and casualty transport duties. In 2015, the EC155 was formally renamed to the H155, in line with Eurocopter's corporate rebranding as Airbus Helicopters.

Development

Originally designated AS365 N4, the EC155 was developed from the Eurocopter AS365 N3 Dauphin 2 with the aim of significantly increasing the cabin space of the Dauphin. Development began in September 1996 with the helicopter officially announced by Eurocopter at the Paris Air Show in June 1997. The first EC155 helicopter, a modified Dauphin airframe, made its maiden flight at Marignane on 17 June 1997 and the first pre-production EC155 B flew on 11 March 1998. The aircraft received safety certification by the French and German civil aviation authorities on 11 December 1998 and went into production soon after, with a price tag of US$7–8 million depending on installed equipment.

In March 1999, deliveries of the EC155 B commenced, the German Federal Police became the first operator of the type. Between March 1999 and June 2003, roughly 50 EC155 Dauphins were sold, mainly to VIP and off-shore customers.

The EC155 B1 was developed with uprated engines, giving it improved performance at high altitude and in hot temperature conditions; this derivative also features a higher maximum take-off weight (10,846 lb vs. 10,580 lb). Deliveries of this model began in November 2002 with the Hong Kong Government Flying Service becoming the first operator. In early 2003, Eurocopter completed studies for an even more powerful version of the EC155 B1, designed to better compete with new rotorcraft such as the AgustaWestland AW139 and to better meet military customer's requirements.

In 2015, an EC155 was also used by Airbus Helicopters as a flying testbed for new aerodynamic features, such as the rotor blades, biplane stabilizer and canted fenestron, for the developing Airbus Helicopters H160 helicopter.

In 2015, Airbus Helicopters and Korean Aerospace Industries (KAI) formed an agreement to transfer principle manufacturing activity for the EC155 to South Korea; KAI shall become the sole manufacturer of the type after 2018, and both firms shall be jointly involved in the international marketing and further development of the type. The EC155 is to serve as the basis for KAI's Light Civil Helicopter (LCH) and Light Armed Helicopter (LAH), featuring numerous changes including a new cockpit, improved gearbox and rotor blades; the LAH shall have a chin-mounted 20 mm cannon and side-mounted guided rockets, countermeasures systems, and be able to carry 6–10 combat troops. The LCH is to enter service in 2020, and the LAH will follow in 2022 to replace the MD 500 Defender and AH-1J/S Cobra. Airbus foresees a South Korean demand for 100 LCHs and 214 LAHs, and estimates an international market of 300–400 LAH versions to replace legacy attack helicopters.

Design

The EC155 B features a completely redesigned cabin providing 30% more passenger space than previous Dauphin helicopter models, plus a 130% increase in baggage hold volume. Other major improvements include a five-blade Spheriflex composite main rotor combined with the familiar shrouded Fenestron tail rotor to reduce vibration levels significantly. The EC155 B is powered by two 635 kW (851 shp) Turbomeca Arriel 2C1 turboshaft engines mounted over the luggage hold, which feature a dual-channel Full Authority Digital Engine Control (FADEC) system. The EC155 B1 features uprated 697 kW (935 shp) Arriel 2C2s. The helicopter can be fitted with an anti-icing system to enable the aircraft to operate in very cold climates. The all-glass cockpit is equipped with an 'Avionique Nouvelle' integrated digital flight control system featuring Eurocopter's Vehicle and Engine Management Display (VEMD), which utilizes active matrix liquid crystal displays. The EC155 is also equipped with a four-axis digital autopilot, coupled to the engine FADECs for full-envelope protection, and is offered with a Health and Usage Monitoring System (HUMS).

Eurocopter designed the EC155 originally with three configurations, however, another two configurations were added in 2005. The Passenger Transport version can carry 12 passengers in comfort seats or 13 passengers in utility seats, along with 1 or 2 crew. The VIP or Corporate Transport version has a VIP lounge with working space accommodating up to 8 executives. The Casualty Transport version can carry 2 stretchered patients with up to 4 seated medical staff, or 4 patients on stretchers plus 2 seated medical staff. The configurations added in 2005 were for offshore operation and police and parapublic missions ranging from patrol, airborne surveillance, SAR and EMS, the helicopter being fitted with specific mission equipment for these duties.

Variants

 EC155 – The first prototype, built from modifying an existing Dauphin airframe.
 EC155 B – The first production version, powered by two Turbomeca Arriel 2C1 turboshaft engines.
 EC155 B1 – An uprated model equipped with two Turbomeca Arriel 2C2 turboshaft engines and higher M.T.O.W., offering enhanced hot and high performance
 AS565 UC – Designation of early military derivative study
 LCH/LAH – Improved type development by Korea Aerospace Industries. The LCH will enter service in 2020, and the LAH in 2022.

Operators

The aircraft is operated by private individuals, companies and charter operators. It is also operated by government organisations and as an offshore transport for the gas and oil industry.
  
Police  

 Dominican Republic Air Force
  
Bundespolizei  
NRW Police

  
Government Flying Service

Royal Thai Police

 PennState Health - Life Lion Critical Care
University of Michigan Survival Flight
University of Florida ShandsCair

 Vietnam Helicopter Corporation

Specifications (EC155 B1)

See also

References

Citations

Bibliography

 Gray, Peter. Dauphin "Bigger and Better." Flight International, January 2000. pp. 48–51.

External links
 Airbus Helicopters H155 Official Site

Airbus Helicopters aircraft
1990s French civil utility aircraft
1990s French helicopters
Search and rescue helicopters
Twin-turbine helicopters
Aircraft first flown in 1997